Anthony J. Portantino (born January 29, 1961) is an American politician currently serving in the California State Senate. A Democrat, he represents the 25th Senate District which encompasses portions of the San Fernando and San Gabriel valleys. Portantino was a member of the California State Assembly from 2006 to 2012, representing the 44th Assembly District.

Political career 
Portantino served two terms on the La Cañada Flintridge City Council, from 1999 until 2006.  There, he was mentored by Carol Liu, who endorsed him to succeed her in the California state assembly.

Portantino's professional experience includes working in the art department and as property master with the American Playhouse; production designer on Grizzly Adams and the Legend of Dark Mountain; and art director on Unsolved Mysteries.

At the request of the Screen Actors Guild in 2010, Portantino proposed an anti-gatecrashing law that would make party crashing a misdemeanor with punishments being up to six months in jail, or a $1,000 fine, or both. He said that party crashing posed a threat to public safety. He introduced legislation to remove tattoos from victims of forced prostitution.

After his term ended in the California state assembly, Portantino initially stated that he would run for Congress against David Dreier, even though the district had yet to be drawn. He later contemplated a run against Carol Liu in state senate district 25  but opted against it, citing personal reasons. In 2013, Portantino began actively campaigning to fill Liu's seat, as she was term limited in 2016.

In 2022, he authored a bill that would provide $1.65 billion in tax credits through 2030 ($330 million per year) for film production in California.

Portantino announced in January 2023 that he was running for California's 30th congressional district to replace Adam Schiff, who is vacating the seat as a candidate in the 2024 United States Senate election in California.

Political positions

LGBTQ+ rights 
In response by the 2012 decision of the U.S. 9th Circuit Court of Appeals to overturn Proposition 8, Portantino stated “My brother fought this battle for three decades. He spent his life fighting for equality and civil rights. It was a lifelong dream of his to be treated like everyone else.”

In 2022, Portantino attended Glendale Pride. 

Portantino attended a December 2022 candlelight vigil hosted by glendaleOUT to mourn and remember LGBTQ+ deaths. The vigil raised funds for the Transgender Law Center and Pink Armenia.

Armenia and Artsakh
Portantino, who has been collaborating with the Governor Gavin Newsom’s office to educate state officials and colleagues on the historic significance of the project, thanked the Governor for signing California's 2022-2023 State Budget, which allocates $10 million in new funding for the Armenian American Museum.

During a 2022 meeting with the Armenian National Committee of America, Portantino expressed a desire to improve trade relations between California and Armenia.

Zoning regulations and Housing 
In 2017, Portantino voted against SB 35, which streamlined the housing construction process in California.

In February 2019, Portantino introduced a bill to create a “California Housing Crisis Awareness” specialized license plate program to raise an estimated $300,000 per year to fund affordable housing, before administrative costs. The bill later died in committee.

In May 2019, Portantino, as Senate appropriations committee chair, used a pocket veto to temporarily block SB 50, a bill that would enact reforms to address the California housing shortage by reducing local control (such as allowing more apartment construction near public transit and in suburbs), from leaving committee to enter the Senate for debate and voting. Proponents of the bill accused Portantino of abusing his powers to deny Senate Bill 50 a debate and a vote in the Senate. The Los Angeles Times wrote that Portantino's opposition to the bill was expected, but that it was a surprise that he would not allow the bill to advance out of committee. Due to Portantino's action, the bill was not considered by the Senate until 2020.

In 2021, Portantino killed a bill that would have put an end to minimum parking requirements for certain new housing construction near transit stations.

In October 2021, Portantino criticized the construction of 98 townhouses on the location of a bowling center and recreation center in Burbank. Portantino questioned the legality of the housing development.

References

External links 
 
 
 Join California Anthony Portantino

Democratic Party California state senators
1961 births
Albright College alumni
Living people
Democratic Party members of the California State Assembly
21st-century American politicians
People from Long Branch, New Jersey
People from La Cañada Flintridge, California
Appropriations Committee member, California State Senate
Candidates in the 2024 United States House of Representatives elections